Takabbur is a Pakistani drama serial being telecast on A-Plus Entertainment TV channel in Pakistan. It is written by Shahzad Javed and Nooran Makhdoom and produced by Six Sigma Entertainment.

Synopsis 
Takabur is the story of a girl named Mehru who is the dearest and proud daughter of Hakeem Ahmed. Hakeem is a very stubborn and egoistic person and he is now under debt and is under constant fear from creditors that his property might get seized. Mehru's cousin Asad loves her and wants to marry her but Hakeem Sahab rejects him only on THE BASIS OF dark complexion. A couple of times Mehru had to face embarrassment while being dressed as a to be bride and all this is because of her father who is in search of a wealthy person for Mehru so that he can get him out of debt. This drama depicts the harsh reality where a father is using her daughter as a pawn while also claiming that he loves her a lot. The question to ponder over is that who will be the guy who will marry Mehru? How will her dad use her further after he gets her married? What will become of Mehru?

Cast 
Firdous Jamal as Hakeem sahib,
Aly Khan as Kabeer, 
Fatima kunwar as Mehru, 
Maryam Ansari as Masooma, 
Kaif Ghaznavi as Farisa, 
Asim Mehmood as Zarak, 
Salman Saeed as Asad, 
Zainab Qayyum as Shabana,
Shaheen Khan as Mehru's mother 
Rahma Saleem as Sweety, 
Hasan Farid Khan as Abdullah, 
Sajid Shah as Sabghat, 
Humaira Zahid as Mubeena, 
Shazia Qaiser as Syeda, 
Fazal Hussain as Maaro, 
Rizwana Wahab as Sanober, 
Jasmine as Laila,
Abu rohan as Molvi Sahab, 
Neelam as Maid, 
Birjees Farooqui as Tayyaba,

OST
Takabbur OST Title Song 
Singer Abida Hussain,
Composer Waqar Ali,

Timing
Takabbur Drama Will Start from 23 July 2015 at 8:00 PM

Executive Producer 
Sadia Jabbar

Directed by 
Ahsan Talish

Written by 
Shahzad Javed & Nooran Makhdoom

Channel 
A-Plus TV, Pakistan

Pakistani drama television series
A-Plus TV original programming